Hodometer may refer to:

Hodometer, an older name for an Odometer, a device for measuring the distance travelled by a vehicle
Hodometer, a Surveyor's wheel, a device for measuring distance. Also called a waywiser or perambulator.